Hastula aciculina is a species of sea snail, a marine gastropod mollusk in the family Terebridae, the auger snails.

Description

Distribution
This marine species occurs off Senegal.

References

 Deshayes, G. P., 1859. A general review of the genus Terebra, and a description of new species. Proceedings of the Zoological Society of London 27: 270-321
  Gofas, S.; Afonso, J.P.; Brandào, M. (Ed.). (S.a.). Conchas e Moluscos de Angola = Coquillages et Mollusques d'Angola. [Shells and molluscs of Angola]. Universidade Agostinho / Elf Aquitaine Angola: Angola. 140 pp.
 Bernard, P.A. (Ed.) (1984). Coquillages du Gabon [Shells of Gabon]. Pierre A. Bernard: Libreville, Gabon. 140, 75 plates pp
 Bouchet P. (1983 ["1982"]) Les Terebridae (Mollusca, Gastropoda) de l'Atlantique oriental. Bollettino Malacologico 18: 185–216
 Bratcher T. & Cernohorsky W.O. (1987). Living terebras of the world. A monograph of the recent Terebridae of the world. American Malacologists, Melbourne, Florida & Burlington, Massachusetts. 240pp.
 Terryn Y. & Ryall P. (2014) West African Terebridae, with the description of a new species from the Cape Verde Islands. Conchylia 44(3–4): 27–47

External links
 Lamarck, J.-B. de. (1822). Histoire naturelle des animaux sans vertèbres, présentant les caractères généraux et particuliers de ces animaux, leur distribution, leurs classes, leurs familles, leurs genres, et la citation des principales espèces qui s'y rapportent; précédée d'une introduction offrant la détermination des caractères essentiels de l'animal, sa distinction du végétal et des autres corps naturel; enfin, l'exposition des principes fondamentaux de la zoologie. Tome septième. 711 pp. Paris (Lamarck)

Terebridae
Gastropods described in 1822